Aksel Gürcan Demirtaş (born 2 January 1973 in Varna) is Turkish athlete specialising in the sprinting events. During her long career, she has represented Turkey at multiple international competitions, including the 1997 World Championships, six World Indoor Championships, three European outdoor and five indoor championships, although with little success.

Her 60 metres personal best of 6.21 seconds is the still standing national record.

Competition record

1Did not finish in the semifinals

Personal bests
Outdoor
100 metres – 11.49 (+1.8 m/s) (Kalamáta 2001)
200 metres – 23.71 (Ankara 1999)
Indoor
60 metres – 7.27 (Moscow 2001)
200 metres – 23.79 (Piraeus 2002)

References

1973 births
Living people
Turkish female sprinters
Sportspeople from Varna, Bulgaria
Bulgarian Turks in Turkey
Athletes (track and field) at the 1997 Mediterranean Games
Athletes (track and field) at the 2001 Mediterranean Games
Athletes (track and field) at the 2013 Mediterranean Games
Mediterranean Games competitors for Turkey